Greece has an embassy in New Delhi and three honorary consulates in Kolkata, Chennai and Mumbai. India has an embassy in Athens and an honorary consulate in Thessaloniki. As of 2020, the relation between the two countries is closer than ever and is considered historical and strategic by both parts.

Historical relations

Ancient era

For the ancient Greeks, "India" referred to the polity situated east of Persia and south of the Himalayas (with the exception of Serica). Although, during different periods of history, "India" referred to a much wider or much less extensive place. The Greeks referred to the ancient Indians as "Indói"; the Indians referred to the Greeks as "Yonas (Yavanas)" in reference to the Ionians.

18–19th century
The settlement of Greek merchants in Bengal began in the early eighteenth century and lasted until the middle of the twentieth century.

The trading house of the Ralli Brothers which operated in Kolkata and Dhaka was the most important Greek business presence in India during the 19th and 20th centuries.

Dimitrios Galanos (1760–1833) was the first modern Greek Indologist who lived for 40 years in India and translated many Sanskrit texts into Greek making available the knowledge of the philosophical and literary traditions of India in Greece and the rest of the world.

The church, cemetery and property of the Greek community of Bengal are currently managed by the Charitable Foundation of the Greek Orthodox Church in Kolkata.

DNA analysis from the skeletons of the Roopkund Lake, revealed that 14 skeletons (dated ~1800 CE) had a genetic ancestry tied to Greece.

Modern

Diplomatic relations between Greece and India started in May 1950. India opened its resident Embassy in Athens in March 1978. The new Greek Embassy building in New Delhi was inaugurated on 6 February 2001.

The graves of Indians who died in Greece during the two World Wars are located in the memorial grounds of the cemeteries of the Allied Forces in Athens, Thessaloniki and Lemnos.

Thessaloniki was twinned with Kolkata in January 2005.

India and Greece enjoy close bilateral relations and Greece supports India's candidacy as a permanent member of the United Nations Security Council.

Cultural Relations

On 26 November 1926, Nobel Laureate Poet Rabindranath Tagore visited Athens.

The "Dimitrios Galanos" Chair for Greek Studies was established at Jawaharlal Nehru University in New Delhi, India in September 2000.

The official language of India, Hindi, has been taught at the Foreign Language Teaching Center of the National and Kapodistrian University of Athens since 2005.

Sanskrit, Hindi, Indian philosophy and South Asian history and Culture have been taught at the Athens Center for Indian and Indo-Hellenic Studies since 2016.

In March and April 1995, the Indian Council for Cultural Relations (ICCR) and the Hellenic Foundation for Culture co-organized an International Symposium on "India – Greece: 2500 Years of Cultural Exchange" at the India International Center in New Delhi.

In February 2018, Indira Gandhi National Center for the Arts (IGNCA) and Benares Hindu University (BHU) organized an international conference entitled "Dimitrios Galanos and his Legacy: Indo-Greek Studies 1790–2018" held in two phases, one in New Delhi and one in Varanasi, India.

In November 2018, Europe's 1st International Symposium on Jainism was organized by ELINEPA at the Corfu Museum of Asian Art.

In June 2019, the 17th International Hindi Conference was organized by ELINEPA in Athens.

On 26 June 2021, the Ministers of External Affairs of Greece and India Nikos Dendias and S. Jaishankar and the Mayor of Athens Kostas Bakoyannis unveiled the statue of Mahatma Gandhi in Athens.

In November 2021, ELINEPA and the Indian Council for Cultural Relations (ICCR) co-organized a painting exhibition and a series of cultural events in New Delhi and Chandigarh as part of the celebrations for the 200th anniversary of the Greek Revolution.

On 1 March 2022, a conferment ceremony was organized in Athens to present the Padma Shri Award from the President of India Ram Nath Kovind to the Greek Indologist Prof. Nicholas Kazanas for his distinguished service and contribution towards the enrichment of literature and education.

In December 2022, the chair for Greek Studies at Jawaharlal Nehru University and the Hellenic Institute of Byzantine and Post-Byzantine Studies (Venice) co-organized an International Conference on: "The Greek World and India: History, Culture and Trade from Hellenistic Period to Modern Times' at Jawaharlal Nehru University Conference Centre, New Delhi.

Economic Relations

About 12,000–13,000 Indian people live and work in Greece.
 
Annual bilateral trade stands at $0,83 billion. The figures from the Hellenic Statistical Authority (ELSTAT) indicate that the trade balance is consistently in deficit
to the detriment of Greece. In 2021, a deficit of €564,8 million was recorded as Greek exports amounted to €134,2 million, recording a significant increase of 74,6% compared to 2020, while imports to €699,1 million, recording an increase of 68,4% compared to 2020.

Some Indian companies, like restaurants, mini markets and tourist agents, have started operating in Athens, Myconos, Santorini and other places in Greece. Greek companies also have partners in India.

An infrastructure consortium made up of India's GMR Airports Limited (GAL) and Greek GEK Terna has won the tender for the construction of the new Kastelli airport in Heraklion, Crete.

India has been an honored country at the 74th (2009) and the 84th (2019) Thessaloniki International Fair.

The first Greek Indian Business Association was established in Athens in June 2019.

List of recent bilateral visits
In February 1963, the King of Greece Paul and the Queen Friderica paid an official visit to India.
In March 1982, the President of the Hellenic Republic, Konstantinos Karamanlis, paid an official visit to India.
In September 1983, the Prime Minister of India Indira Gandhi visited Athens and Delphi.
In December 2000, Greek Foreign Minister George Papandreou visited India.
In February 2001, Prime Minister of Greece Kostas Simitis visited India.
In July 2004, the Indian Minister of Youth Affairs and Sports Sunil Dutt visited Greece on the occasion of the Athens 2004 Olympic Games.
In September 2006, Speaker of the Lok Sabha Somnath Chatterjee visited Greece.
In February 2007, Greek Finance Minister Georgios Alogoskoufis Visited India
In April 2007, President of India Avul Pakir Jainulabdeen Abdul Kalam made an official visit to Athens.
In January 2008, Prime Minister Kostas Karamanlis visited India
In December 2015, Greek Defence Minister Panos Kammenos visited India
In April 2018, India's State Minister of Agriculture Shri Gajendra Singh Shekhawat visited Greece
In June 2018, President of India Ram Nath Kovind made an official visit to Athens.
In September 2019, India's Minister of Commerce and Industry Hardeep Singh Puri visited Greece and Inaugurated the Indian Pavilion in Thessaloniki International Fair
In June 2021, India's Minister of External Affairs S. Jaishankar visited Greece
In March 2022, Greek Foreign Minister Nikos Dendias visited India
In January 2023, India's Minister of State for External Affairs and Culture Meenakashi Lekhi visited Greece

List of bilateral treaties

Agreement on Cultural Exchange, 1961
Agreement on Avoidance of Double Taxation, 1967
Agreement for Joint Commission for Economic, Scientific and Technical Cooperation, 1983.
Joint Business Council of FICCI and ASSOCHAM and the Athens Chamber of Commerce, 1996.
Agreement of Co-operation between Hellenic Foreign Trade Board and India *Trade Promotion Organisation, 1996.
Agreement on Tourism Cooperation, 1998.
MoU on Defence Cooperation, 1998.
MoU for Cooperation in Agriculture, 2001.
Agreement on Promotion and Reciprocal Protection of Investments (BIPA), 2007.
Agreement on Co-operation in Science & Technology, 2007.
MOU between CII and Federation of Greek Industries, 2007.
MOU for Co-operation between Institute of Science, Bengaluru and *National Technical University of Athens (NTUA), 2007

See also
Foreign relations of Greece
Foreign relations of India

References

Further reading
 Greek Indian Economic Forum, ELINEPA
 "India in Greece" by E.Pococke (1852)
 "The Greeks in India" by Demetrios Th. Vassiliades (2000)
 "The shape of Ancient Thought: Comparative Studies in Greek and Indian Philosophies" by Thomas McEvilley
 "Greeks and Buddhism" by Demetrios Th. Vassiliades (2016)
Kazanas, Nicholas. "Archaic Greece and the Veda." Annals of the Bhandarkar Oriental Research Institute 82.1/4 (2001): 1–42.
Kazanas, N. "Advaita and Gnosticism." Indian Historical Review 32.1 (2005): 197–254.
Kazanas, Nicholas. "Renaissances with Vedic Vaāk and Hellenic Logos." IUP Journal of History & Culture 4.4 (2010).
Kazanas, N. 2004 'Plato and the Upaniṣads' in Brahmavidyā: Adyar Library Bulletin.
Swarup, Ram (2000). " India and Greece" In: On Hinduism: Reviews and reflections. New Delhi: Voice of India.
Timothy Lomperis, Hindu Influence on Greek Philosophy: The Odyssey of the Soul From the Upanishads to Plato 
Meenakshi Jain, The India They Saw : Foreign accounts (co-edited with Sandhya Jain, 4 Volumes, Prabhat Prakashan), .
Majumdar, R. C. (1981). The Classical accounts of India: Being a compilation of the English translations of the accounts left by Herodotus, Megasthenes, Arrian, Strabo, Quintus, Diodorus, Siculus, Justin, Plutarch, Frontinus, Nearchus, Apollonius, Pliny, Ptolemy, Aelian, and others with maps. Calcutta: Firma KLM.

External links
  Greek Ministry of Foreign Affairs about the relation with India
 Indian embassy in Athens
Hellenic-Indian Society for Culture and Development (ELINEPA)

 
India
Greece